The Franz Nabl Prize is an biennial Austrian literature award. The prize was first awarded in 1975 by the city of Graz. The prize money is €14,500 (since 2019: €15,000).

Recipients

 1975 Elias Canetti
 1977 Manès Sperber
 1979 Ilse Aichinger
 1981 Hermann Lenz
 1983 Christa Wolf
 1985 Peter Handke (Prize passed on to Michael Donhauser and Walter Grond)
 1987 Wolfgang Koeppen
 1989 H.C. Artmann
 1991 Wilhelm Muster
 1993 Martin Walser
 1995 Christoph Ransmayr
 1997 Herta Müller
 1999 Barbara Frischmuth
 2001 Urs Widmer
 2003 Norbert Gstrein
 2005 Josef Winkler
 2007 Terézia Mora
 2009 Alfred Kolleritsch
 2011 Angela Krauß
 2013 Florjan Lipuš
 2015 Marlene Streeruwitz
 2017 Dževad Karahasan
 2019 Olga Flor
 2021 Kathrin Röggla

References

Austrian literary awards
Awards established in 1975